The 1924 Fordham Maroon football team was an American football team that represented Fordham University as an independent during the 1924 college football season. In its fifth season under coach Frank Gargan, Fordham compiled a 6–2 record and outscored opponents by a total of 148 to 53. Fordham's media guide claims an additional three victories for a 9–2 record, but no contemporaneous record has been found of those games.

Schedule

References

Fordham
Fordham Rams football seasons
Fordham Maroon football